Willi Neuberger (born 15 April 1946 in Röllfeld) is a German former professional footballer who played as a defender.

He played from 1966 until 1983 in the Bundesliga for Borussia Dortmund, Werder Bremen, Wuppertaler SV and Eintracht Frankfurt. With Eintracht he won the DFB-Pokal in 1975 and 1981 and UEFA Cup in 1980.

With his 520 Bundesliga appearances he was the record player for a long time before he was overtaken by teammate Charly Körbel. As of April 2011 he is eighth on the all-time appearance list of the Bundesliga.

He won two caps for West Germany in 1968.

References

External links
 
 
 

Living people
1946 births
German footballers
Association football defenders
Germany international footballers
Germany B international footballers
Germany under-21 international footballers
UEFA Cup winning players
Bundesliga players
Borussia Dortmund players
SV Werder Bremen players
Wuppertaler SV players
Eintracht Frankfurt players
People from Miltenberg
Sportspeople from Lower Franconia
Footballers from Bavaria
West German footballers